Abdrashitovo (Äbdräşit) is a rural locality (a selo) in Abdrashitovsky Selsoviet, Alsheyevsky District, Bashkortostan, Russia. The population was 619 as of 2010. There are 8 streets.

Geography 
Abdrashitovo is located 27 km east of Rayevsky (the district's administrative centre) by road. Maloabdrashitovo is the nearest rural locality.

Ethnicity 
The village is inhabited by Bashkirs and others.

References 

Rural localities in Alsheyevsky District